Sikka is an Indian surname seen in northern part of India. Notable people with the name include:
 Prem Sikka, British professor of accounting
 Vishal Sikka, Ex-CEO Infosys

References

Indian surnames
Punjabi-language surnames
Surnames of Indian origin
Hindu surnames
Khatri clans
Khatri surnames